Venetian Bird is a 1952 British thriller film starring Richard Todd, Eva Bartok and John Gregson, and directed by Ralph Thomas. The screenplay was adapted by Victor Canning from his own 1950 novel of the same title. It was shot at Pinewood Studios and on location in Venice. The film's sets were designed by the art director George Provis. It was released in America by United Artists where it was titled The Assassin.

Box and Thomas decided not to use colour shooting the film as they felt that it would not suit the genre.

Plot

British private detective Edward Mercer (Richard Todd) is employed to travel to Venice and locate an Italian who is to be rewarded for his assistance to an Allied airman during the Second World War. Once he arrives in Italy, however, he becomes mixed up in an assassination plot enveloped in a great deal of mystery. Central to it is whether Renzo Uccello (John Gregson) actually died a few years earlier in World War II or not.

Cast
 Richard Todd as Edward Mercer
 Eva Bartok as Adriana Medova
 John Gregson as Renzo Uccello
 George Coulouris as Chief of Police Spadoni
 Margot Grahame as Rosa Melitus
 David Hurst as Minelli
 Walter Rilla as Count Boria
 John Bailey as Lieutenant Longo
 Sid James as Bernardo
 Martin Boddey as 	Gufo
 Michael Balfour as Moretto
 Sydney Tafler as Boldesca
 Miles Malleson as Grespi
 Eric Pohlmann as Gostini
 Raymond Young as 	Luigi
 Ferdy Mayne as Tio
 Jill Clifford as 	Renata
 Eileen Way as 	Woman Detective
 Toni Lucarda as 	Nerva
 Janice Kane as 	Ninetta
 Meier Tzelniker as 	Mayor of Mirave

Production
Michael Balcon initially rejected the idea of a film based on Canning's novel because it was set in Italy and dealt with Italians, not Britons. Betty Box appealed to Earl St John, who overruled Balcon. Italian censors required that the script clarify the political struggles in post-war Venice that were portrayed in the novel.

References

External links
 
Venetian Bird at Britmovie

1952 films
Films scored by Nino Rota
1950s English-language films
British detective films
British thriller films
Films directed by Ralph Thomas
Films shot at Pinewood Studios
Films set in Venice
Films produced by Betty Box
1950s thriller films
Films based on British novels
British black-and-white films
1950s British films